Edward Rowe may refer to:
Edward Rowe Mores (1731–1778), English antiquarian and scholar
Edward Rowe (politician) (1902–1971), American senator
Edward Rowe Snow (1902–1982), American author and historian
Edward Rowe (actor) (born 1979), English actor
Edward Rowe (footballer) (born 2003), English footballer